Younes Boudadi (born 23 January 1996) is a professional footballer who plays for Indy Eleven in the USL Championship. Born in Belgium, he has represented Morocco at youth level.

Career

Amateur 
Boudadi joined Club Brugge when he was just 7 years old and played with them for over 13 years.

After leaving Club Brugge, Boudadi opted to move to the United States to play college soccer, and accepted a scholarship to play at Boston College in 2016. After two years in Boston, Boudadi transferred to play at Creighton University, where he played for a further two years.

Whilst at college, Boudadi appeared for fourth-tier sides in the USL PDL and the NPSL. In 2017 he played with Boston Bolts and in 2018 Laredo Heat.

Professional 
On 13 January 2020, Boudadi was selected 102nd overall in the 2020 MLS SuperDraft by Los Angeles FC. However, he did not sign with the club.

On 26 March 2020, Boudadi signed with USL Championship side Reno 1868. He made his debut on 19 July 2020, appearing as a 56th-minute substitute in a 1-0 loss to Sacramento Republic.

Following Reno's folding, due to the financial impact of the COVID-19 pandemic, Boudadi signed with USL Championship side Hartford Athletic on 22 December 2020.

On 2 December 2022, it was announced Boudadi would join USL Championship side Indy Eleven ahead of their upcoming 2023 season.

International
Boudadi has represented Morocco at under-17 and under-20 levels, including at the 2013 FIFA U-17 World Cup.

Personal life
Boudadi is a polyglot, speaking five languages: Arabic, Flemish, French, Dutch and English.

Racial abuse incident
After Hartford defeated Loudoun United on 4 July 2021, Boudadi received a number of racist messages on Instagram. Boudadi went public with these messages immediately and the United Soccer League was able to investigate and ban the unnamed perpetrator from all USL events.

References

External links 
 Younes Boudadi - Men's Soccer Boston College bio
 Younes Boudadi - 2019 - Men's Soccer Creighton bio
 Younes Boudadi | Player Profile | Reno 1868 FC Reno 1868 bio
 
 Younes Boudadi USL bio

1996 births
Living people
Sportspeople from Ypres
Footballers from West Flanders
Moroccan footballers
Morocco youth international footballers
Belgian footballers
Belgian sportspeople of Moroccan descent
Moroccan expatriate footballers
Moroccan expatriate sportspeople in the United States
Expatriate soccer players in the United States
Association football defenders
Boston College Eagles men's soccer players
Creighton Bluejays men's soccer players
Boston Bolts players
Laredo Heat players
Reno 1868 FC players
Hartford Athletic players
Indy Eleven players
National Premier Soccer League players
USL League Two players
USL Championship players
Los Angeles FC draft picks